The Maribor prison massacres were a series of massacres perpetrated by the Germans against the ethnic Slovenian population in the city of Maribor, which had been annexed by Nazi Germany, in present-day Slovenia. The Germans systematically murdered a total of 689 ethnic Slovenians from Maribor and surrounding areas in the hopes of Germanising the city and Slovenian Styria.

Background 

Maribor as most of Slovene Lands had been part of the Kingdom of Yugoslavia since 1918. In 1941 Nazi Germany attacked and defeated Yugoslavia and quickly established an occupation system. Maribor together with Slovenian Styria was annexed to Nazi Germany and a brutal process of Germanisation began.

Massacres 
The massacres of ethnic Slovenians in Maribor range from 1941 and all the way to April 1945. The first massacre was perpetrated on 24 August 1941 and the last one only a month before the end of the war. The worst single day massacre occurred on 2 October 1942, when the Germans murdered 143 Slovenian civilians.

Aftermath 

After the war and the liberation of Maribor and Slovenia, Erwin Rösener was put on trial and found guilty of the Maribor prison massacres among others. He was hanged on 4 September 1946.

See also 

 List of massacres in Slovenia

References 

Massacres in Slovenia
Maribor